Ruslan Ivanov (born 18 December 1973 in Chişinău) is a former Moldovan road bicycle racer.

Palmares

1997
National Road Championships
1st  Time trial
1st  Road race
 2nd, Overall, Baby Giro
1998
National Road Championships
1st  Time trial
1st  Road race
 1st, GP d'Europe (with Massimo Cigana)
2000
 1st  Road race, National Road Championships
 1st, Giro di Toscana
2001
 1st, Overall, Settimana Internazionale di Coppi e Bartali
 Winner Stages 2 & 3
 1st, Stage 2, Giro del Trentino
 2nd, Overall, Regio-Tour
 Winner Stage 2b
National Road Championships
2nd Time trial
3rd Road race
 10th, Tirreno–Adriatico
2002
 1st, GP Lugano
 1st, Stage 5, Settimana Internazionale di Coppi e Bartali
 1st, Stage 4, Settimana Lombarda
 5th, Tirreno–Adriatico
2003
 1st, Stage 5, Vuelta a Andalucía
 1st, Stage 5, Settimana Internazionale di Coppi e Bartali
 1st, Stage 2, Giro d'Abruzzo
 1st, Stage 3, Brixia Tour
2008
 1st, Tour de Langkawi

External links 

Moldovan male cyclists
1973 births
Living people
Olympic cyclists of Moldova
Cyclists at the 1996 Summer Olympics
Cyclists at the 2004 Summer Olympics
20th-century Moldovan people
21st-century Moldovan people